The term "Palestinians" tends mainly to be used as a short form for the Palestinian people, defined as equivalent to Palestinian Arabs, i.e., an Arabic-speaking people descended from the people who have lived in Palestine over the centuries. This usage may be intended to imply that other residents of Palestine (historical or otherwise), particularly Palestinian Jews, are not Palestinians.

Types of Palestinian identity past and present

By geography, pre-1948
Prior to the 1948 Palestine war and the establishment of the State of Israel, a "Palestinian" could mean any person who was born in or hailed from the region of Palestine or was a citizen of the Mandatory Palestine. The term covered all the inhabitants of the region, including people from Muslim, Christian and Jewish backgrounds, and all ethnicities, including the Dom people, Samaritans, Druze, Bedouins and the traditional Jewish communities of Palestine, or Old Yishuv, whose ancestors already living there prior to the onset of Zionist immigration.

By geography, post-1948
In the aftermath of the 1948 Palestine war and the establishment of the State of Israel, a "Palestinian" tends to refer to individuals from non-Jewish communities born in the West Bank and Gaza, and citizens of the State of Palestine, including the populations of Palestinian refugees living in the wide Middle East and other Palestinian diaspora populations worldwide.

In Israeli, former Palestinian Jews that acquired Israeli citizenship became Israelis, while non-Jewish Palestinians that acquired Israeli citizenship came to be referred to as Israeli Arabs or Druze.

The Jewish Virtual Library notes: "Although anyone with roots in the land that is now Israel, the West Bank and Gaza is technically a Palestinian, the term is now more commonly used to refer to non-Jew Arabs with such roots ... Most of the world's Palestinian population is concentrated in Israel, the West Bank, the Gaza Strip and Jordan, although many Palestinians live in Lebanon, Syria and other Arab countries."

Palestinian refugees

UNRWA defines the Palestinian refugees as those whose normal place of residence between June 1946 and May 1948 was in the land that is now Israel, but they went outside during the 1948 war. UNRWA, however, provides aid to Palestinian refugees defined as such, as well as the descendants of those Palestinians. UNRWA does define "Palestinian refugees" to include descendants of "refugees".

By ethnic grouping

The word "Palestinian" is also sometimes used by ethnographers and linguists to denote the specific Arab subculture of the southern Levant; in that sense, it includes not only the Arabs of British Mandate Palestine, but also those inhabitants of Jordan who are originally from Palestine and the Druze, while excluding both Bedouin (who culturally and linguistically group with the Arabian Peninsula) and ethnic minorities such as the Dom and the Samaritans.

Emergence as a national identity

The timing and causes behind the emergence of a distinctively Palestinian national consciousness among the Arabs of Palestine are matters of scholarly disagreement. Some argue that it can be traced as far back as the peasants' revolt in Palestine in 1834 (or even as early as the 17th century), while others argue that it did not emerge until after the Mandatory Palestine period. Legal historian Assaf Likhovski states that the prevailing view is that Palestinian identity originated in the early decades of the 20th century, when an embryonic desire among Palestinians for self-government in the face of generalized fears that Zionism would lead to a Jewish state and the dispossession of the Arab majority crystallised among most editors, Christian and Muslim, of local newspapers. The term itself Filasṭīnī was first introduced by  Khalīl Beidas in a translation of a Russian work on the Holy Land into Arabic in 1898. After that, its usage gradually spread so that, by 1908, with the loosening of censorship controls under late Ottoman rule, a  number of Muslim, Christian and Jewish correspondents writing for newspapers began to use the term with great frequency in referring to the 'Palestinian people'(ahl/ahālī Filasṭīn), 'Palestinians' (al-Filasṭīnīyūn) the 'sons of Palestine(abnā’ Filasṭīn) or to 'Palestinian society',(al-mujtama' al-filasṭīnī).
Whatever the differing viewpoints over the timing, causal mechanisms, and orientation of Palestinian nationalism, by the early 20th century strong opposition to Zionism and evidence of a burgeoning nationalistic Palestinian identity is found in the content of Arabic-language newspapers in Palestine, such as Al-Karmil (est. 1908) and Filasteen (est. 1911). Filasteen initially focused its critique of Zionism around the failure of the Ottoman administration to control Jewish immigration and the large influx of foreigners, later exploring the impact of Zionist land-purchases on Palestinian peasants (fellahin), expressing growing concern over land dispossession and its implications for the society at large.

Historian Rashid Khalidi's 1997 book Palestinian Identity: The Construction of Modern National Consciousness is considered a "foundational text" on the subject. He notes that the archaeological strata that denote the history of Palestine – encompassing the Biblical, Roman, Byzantine, Umayyad, Abbasid, Fatimid, Crusader, Ayyubid, Mamluk and Ottoman periods – form part of the identity of the modern-day Palestinian people, as they have come to understand it over the last century. Noting that Palestinian identity has never been an exclusive one, with "Arabism, religion, and local loyalties" playing an important role, Khalidi cautions against the efforts of some extreme advocates of Palestinian nationalism to "anachronistically" read back into history a nationalist consciousness that is in fact "relatively modern".

Khalidi argues that the modern national identity of Palestinians has its roots in nationalist discourses that emerged among the peoples of the Ottoman empire in the late 19th century that sharpened following the demarcation of modern nation-state boundaries in the Middle East after World War I. Khalidi also states that although the challenge posed by Zionism played a role in shaping this identity, that "it is a serious mistake to suggest that Palestinian identity emerged mainly as a response to Zionism."

Conversely, historian James L. Gelvin argues that Palestinian nationalism was a direct reaction to Zionism. In his book The Israel-Palestine Conflict: One Hundred Years of War he states that "Palestinian nationalism emerged during the interwar period in response to Zionist immigration and settlement." Gelvin argues that this fact does not make the Palestinian identity any less legitimate: "The fact that Palestinian nationalism developed later than Zionism and indeed in response to it does not in any way diminish the legitimacy of Palestinian nationalism or make it less valid than Zionism. All nationalisms arise in opposition to some 'other.' Why else would there be the need to specify who you are? And all nationalisms are defined by what they oppose."

David Seddon writes that "[t]he creation of Palestinian identity in its contemporary sense was formed essentially during the 1960s, with the creation of the Palestine Liberation Organization." He adds, however, that "the existence of a population with a recognizably similar name ('the Philistines') in Biblical times suggests a degree of continuity over a long historical period (much as 'the Israelites' of the Bible suggest a long historical continuity in the same region)."

Baruch Kimmerling and Joel S. Migdal consider the 1834 Peasants' revolt in Palestine as constituting the first formative event of the Palestinian people. From 1516 to 1917, Palestine was ruled by the Ottoman Empire save a decade from the 1830s to the 1840s when an Egyptian vassal of the Ottomans, Muhammad Ali, and his son Ibrahim Pasha successfully broke away from Ottoman leadership and, conquering territory spreading from Egypt to as far north as Damascus, asserted their own rule over the area. The so-called Peasants' Revolt by Palestine's Arabs was precipitated by heavy demands for conscripts. The local leaders and urban notables were unhappy about the loss of traditional privileges, while the peasants were well aware that conscription was little more than a death sentence. Starting in May 1834 the rebels took many cities, among them Jerusalem, Hebron and Nablus and Ibrahim Pasha's army was deployed, defeating the last rebels on 4 August in Hebron. Benny Morris argues that the Arabs in Palestine nevertheless remained part of a larger national pan-Arab or, alternatively, pan-Islamist movement. Walid Khalidi argues otherwise, writing that Palestinians in Ottoman times were "[a]cutely aware of the distinctiveness of Palestinian history ..." and "[a]lthough proud of their Arab heritage and ancestry, the Palestinians considered themselves to be descended not only from Arab conquerors of the seventh century but also from indigenous peoples who had lived in the country since time immemorial, including the ancient Hebrews and the Canaanites before them."

Zachary J. Foster argued in a 2015 Foreign Affairs article that "based on hundreds of manuscripts, Islamic court records, books, magazines, and newspapers from the Ottoman period (1516–1918), it seems that the first Arab to use the term "Palestinian" was Farid Georges Kassab, a Beirut-based Orthodox Christian." He explained further that Kassab's 1909 book Palestine, Hellenism, and Clericalism noted in passing that "the Orthodox Palestinian Ottomans call themselves Arabs, and are in fact Arabs," despite describing the Arabic speakers of Palestine as Palestinians throughout the rest of the book."

Bernard Lewis argues it was not as a Palestinian nation that the Arabs of Ottoman Palestine objected to Zionists, since the very concept of such a nation was unknown to the Arabs of the area at the time and did not come into being until very much later. Even the concept of Arab nationalism in the Arab provinces of the Ottoman Empire, "had not reached significant proportions before the outbreak of World War I." Tamir Sorek, a sociologist, submits that, "Although a distinct Palestinian identity can be traced back at least to the middle of the nineteenth century (Kimmerling and Migdal 1993; Khalidi 1997b), or even to the seventeenth century (Gerber 1998), it was not until after World War I that a broad range of optional political affiliations became relevant for the Arabs of Palestine."

Israeli historian Efraim Karsh takes the view that the Palestinian identity did not develop until after the 1967 war because the Palestinian exodus had fractured society so greatly that it was impossible to piece together a national identity. Between 1948 and 1967, the Jordanians and other Arab countries hosting Arab refugees from Palestine/Israel silenced any expression of Palestinian identity and occupied their lands until Israel's conquests of 1967. The formal annexation of the West Bank by Jordan in 1950, and the subsequent granting of its Palestinian residents Jordanian citizenship, further stunted the growth of a Palestinian national identity by integrating them into Jordanian society.

The idea of a unique Palestinian state distinct from its Arab neighbors was at first rejected by Palestinian representatives. The First Congress of Muslim-Christian Associations (in Jerusalem, February 1919), which met for the purpose of selecting a Palestinian Arab representative for the Paris Peace Conference, adopted the following resolution: "We consider Palestine as part of Arab Syria, as it has never been separated from it at any time. We are connected with it by national, religious, linguistic, natural, economic and geographical bonds."

Denial of Palestinian identity

Since the days of early Christian Zionist, Palestinian identity has been the subject of dismissive rhetoric. The phrase "A land without a people for a people without a land" was used as early as 1843 by a Christian Restorationist clergyman, and the phrase continued to be used for almost a century predominantly by Christian Restorationists, before later being adopted as a Jewish Zionist slogan.

After the inception of the State of Israel, a phrase that has similarly become oft repeated is Israeli Prime Minister Golda Meir's remark that "There was no such thing as Palestinians." as part of an interview with Frank Giles, then deputy editor of The Sunday Times on June 15, 1969, to mark the second anniversary of the Six-Day War. It is considered to be the most famous example of Israeli denial of Palestinian identity, and has been frequently been used to illustrate the denial of Palestinian history and sum up the Palestinians' sense of victimization by Israel.

References

 
Palestinian nationalism